The 2017 Canadian Rugby Championship was the 9th season of the Canadian Rugby Championship. The competition took place between July 14 and August 19, 2017. The format for the 2016 season saw a round-robin system where each team plays each other once, the top two teams then meet in the final.

The BC Bears won their second Championship, claiming the MacTier Cup for the first time since 2009.

Teams

Standings

Fixtures
 All times local to where the game is being played

Week 1

Week 2

Week 3

Week 4

3rd-place play-off

Final

See also 
Canadian Rugby Championship
Rugby Canada

References 

Canadian Rugby Championship
Canadian Rugby Championship seasons
CRC